Robert Giordani (1902-1981) was a French art director. He designed the sets for more than eighty productions during his career.

Selected filmography
 Arlette and Love (1943)
 Rooster Heart (1946)
 The Three Cousins (1947)
 The Ironmaster (1948)
 The Pretty Miller Girl (1949)
 The Prize (1950)
 Monsieur Fabre (1951)
 Topaze (1951)
 Crazy for Love (1952)
 A Hundred Francs a Second (1953)
 Madelon (1955)
 Stopover in Orly (1955)
 The Terror with Women (1956)
 Mademoiselle and Her Gang (1957)
 Girls of the Night (1958)
 The Lord's Vineyard (1958)
 Women's Prison (1958)
 The Indestructible (1959)
 Dynamite Jack (1961)
 It's Not My Business (1962)
 The Bamboo Stroke (1963)
 Relax Darling (1964)
 Angelique and the King (1966)
 Untamable Angelique (1967)
 Angelique and the Sultan (1968)

References

Bibliography
 Alessandro Pirolini. The Cinema of Preston Sturges: A Critical Study. McFarland, 2014.

External links

1902 births
1981 deaths
French art directors
Film people from Paris